Santa Cruz Airport is an airport  west of Santa Cruz, a city in the O'Higgins Region of Chile.

The marked runway has a  overrun on the northwest end, terminated by a hangar.

See also

Transport in Chile
List of airports in Chile

References

External links
OpenStreetMap - Santa Cruz
OurAirports - Santa Cruz
FallingRain - Santa Cruz Airport

Airports in Chile
Airports in O'Higgins Region